The Battle of Fulhope Law was a battle between Scottish raiders and the English garrisons of Jedburgh and Roxburgh castles in September 1400. The Scottish were routed and a large number of prisoners taken.

Battle
Robert de Umfraville, led the English garrisons of Jedburgh and Roxburgh castles inflicting a defeat on a large Scots army at Fulhope Law after an attempted a raid. Prisoners included several border reivers, including the notorious fugitives Willie Barde and Adam, Lord of Gordon.

Citations

References
 
 

1400 in England
1400 in Scotland
Conflicts in 1400